Øvrebø og Hægeland is a former municipality that was located in the old Vest-Agder county in Norway. The  municipality existed from 1865 until its dissolution in 1896. It was located in the northern part of the present-day municipality of Vennesla, to the west of the Otra river.  The administrative centre of the municipality was the village of Øvrebø, where Øvrebø Church is located.

History
The municipality of Øvrebø og Hægeland was established in 1865 when the old municipality of Øvrebø was divided into Vennesla (population: 1,103) and Øvrebø og Hægeland (population: 1,829). The municipality existed until 1 July 1896, when it was split to create two new municipalities: Øvrebø (population: 888) and Hægeland (population: 843). These two municipalities later merged into Vennesla municipality in 1964.

Name
The municipality is a combination of the names of two parishes: Øvrebø and Hægeland. Øvrebø is named after the old Øvrebø farm, since the first Øvrebø Church was built there. The first part of the name means "upper" and second part of the name is identical with the word bœr which means "farm" and it is cognate with the Dutch language word "boer" which means "farmer".  The name therefore means "the upper farm".

Hægeland is named after the old Hægeland farm.  The first element of the name means "holy" ( and ) and the last element is identical with the word land which means "land".  This area was important to ancient Norse pagan worship.

See also
List of former municipalities of Norway

References

External links

Vennesla
Former municipalities of Norway
1865 establishments in Norway
1896 disestablishments in Norway